Escurinho may refer to:

 Escurinho River, river in Minas Gerais, Brazil
 Escurinho (footballer, 1930–2020), Benedito Custódio Ferreira, Brazilian football attacking midfielder
 Escurinho (footballer, 1950–2011), Luís Carlos Machado, Brazilian football striker